Namba Line may refer to either of the following railway lines in Osaka Prefecture, Japan:
 Kintetsu Namba Line, a railway line connecting Osaka Namba Station and Osaka Uehommachi Station
 Hanshin Namba Line, a railway line connecting Osaka Namba Station and Amagasaki Station